The 1986 Hall of Fame Bowl was a college football bowl game featuring the Boston College Eagles and the Georgia Bulldogs. It was the inaugural edition of the Hall of Fame Bowl.

Georgia started the scoring on a 7-yard James Jackson run. Boston College got on the board after Lowe made a 23-yard field goal at 7–3. In the second quarter, quarterback Shawn Halloran threw a 4-yard touchdown strike to Peter Casparriello giving BC a 10–7 lead. Troy Stradford scored on a 1-yard touchdown run, and Lowe added a 37-yard field goal for Boston College to take a 20–7 halftime lead.

In the third quarter, Georgia scored on a 28-yard field goal by Jacobs. With Boston College driving, Gary Moss returned an interception 81 yards for a touchdown, and Georgia was within 20–17. In the fourth quarter, James Jackson scored on a 5-yard touchdown run as Georgia took a 24–20 lead. Shawn Halloran's 5-yard touchdown pass to Kelvin Martin with no time left gave Boston College a 27–24 win.

References

Hall of Fame Bowl
ReliaQuest Bowl
Boston College Eagles football bowl games
Georgia Bulldogs football bowl games
Hall of Fame Bowl
20th century in Tampa, Florida
December 1986 sports events in the United States